California Proposition 85, the Parental Notification Initiative, was a proposition on the ballot for California voters in the general election of November 7, 2006. It was similar to the previous year's Proposition 73. It failed by a vote of 46%-54%.

Text from the California Voter Information Guide
Parental Notification before Termination of Teen's Pregnancy (second attempt at Proposition 73)
PDF Document File of Official Voter Information Guide: Proposition 85

Summary
Summary as prepared by the State Attorney General
"Amends California constitution prohibiting abortion for unemancipated minor until 48 hours after physician notifies parent/guardian, except in medical emergency or parental waiver. Mandates reporting requirements. Authorizes monetary damages against physicians for violation. Put on ballot by Petition Signatures."

Did not pass
3,868,714 (45.8%) voted for it
4,576,128 (54.2%) voted against it

Goals
Increase teen communication with parents
Allow parents to help child make appropriate health care decisions 
Provide needed health care history to physicians
Possibly prevent minor from something as traumatic as an abortion
Provide a strong support system

Vote meaning
A "yes" vote to this would mean that the state constitution would require a physician to notify the guardian of a minor prior to performing an abortion.

A "no" vote to this would mean minors would continue to receive abortion services to the same extent as adults. Physicians performing abortions for minors would not be subject to notification requirements.

Background
1953 - Law was created that enabled minors to have abortions without parental consent or knowledge
1987 - Legislature amended this law to require minors to get parental or guardian consent before having an abortion performed
1997 - Voted against the law therefore allowing minors to have an abortion without consent or knowledge by guardian

Exceptions to Proposition 85
Medical Emergencies: 
An abortion is necessary to preserve the life of the mother

Waivers Approved by Guardian:
Guardian signs a waiver that gets rid of the notification requirements

Waivers Approved by Court:
Waiver given to a minor who asks for it and if the courts finds the minor to be well informed and mature enough to make the decision to have the abortion

Penalty
Any person who performs an abortion on a minor without consent by parents or guardian would be found guilty of a misdemeanor punishable by fine.

Endorsements
Sharon Runner
Ben Stein
Bill O'Reilly
Dr. Laura Schlessinger
Laura Ingraham
Jim Holman, San Diego Reader

References

Legislative Analyst's Office
California Black Women's Health Project
League of Women Voters

External links
Yes on 85
HealthVote.org: Neutral Information & Analysis about Proposition 85
Video Voter California - Short, straightforward video explanation of Prop. 85
Non-partisan resources & vote sharing network for Californians
Official Voter Information Guide: Proposition 85
Campaign Expenditure Details for Proposition 85, Parental Notification

85
Abortion referendums
Failed amendments to the Constitution of California
United States state abortion legislation
Initiatives in the United States
Women in California